Edward F. "Ed" Siudut ( – May 15, 2012) was an American professional basketball player. He was drafted by both the National Basketball Association and American Basketball Association, and played professionally in Italy.

Holy Cross
He totaled 1,611 points, 888 rebounds, and averaged 22.4 points per game and 12.3 rebounds per game during his years at Holy Cross (1966–69).

Personal life
Siudut and his wife were married 40 years and had four children. In addition to basketball, Siudut worked as a probation officer and chief probation officer. He also worked for Peace Corps.

Achievements
First 1,000-point scorer at Everett High School
Ranks third all-time in points scored at College of the Holy Cross
Was inducted into the Holy Cross Varsity Club Hall of Fame in 1986

References

1940s births
2012 deaths
American expatriate basketball people in Italy
American people of Italian descent
Holy Cross Crusaders men's basketball players
New York Nets draft picks
Pallacanestro Cantù players
San Francisco Warriors draft picks
People from Pittsfield, New Hampshire
American men's basketball players
Forwards (basketball)